This is a list of BS degree granting engineering schools in Massachusetts, arranged in alphabetical order.

See also
List of colleges and universities in Massachusetts
List of colleges and universities in metropolitan Boston
List of systems engineering at universities

References

External links
Complete Guide to Engineering Schools, USNews.com, accessed April 16, 2006.

Massachusetts education-related lists
Massachusetts
Massachusetts, Engineering